Office of the Auditor General (OAGN) is a constitutional body and the supreme audit institution of Nepal. It derives its mandate from Article 241 of the Constitution of Nepal and Audit Act, 2075 (2019 A.D.). The Auditor General is empowered to undertake audits of Office of the President and Vice-President, Supreme Court, Federal Parliament, Provincial Assemblies, Provincial Governments, Constitutional bodies or their offices, courts, the Office of the Attorney General and the Nepal Army, Nepal Police and Armed Police as well as of all other government offices and courts with due consideration given to the regularity, economy, efficiency, effectiveness and the propriety of government expenditures.

Auditor General
According to Article 240 of the Constitution of Nepal, the Auditor General is appointed by the President on the recommendation of the Constitutional Council for a single term of six years. The current Auditor General, Tanka Mani Sharma, was appointed on May 22, 2017.

Organization and Structure
In addition to the Auditor General, there are 614 staff positions in the organization. These consist of 4 Deputy Auditor Generals, 18 Assistant Auditor Generals, Directors, Audit Officers, Audit superintendents, Audit Inspectors and support staff. The majority of the staff are members of the Audit Service of the Nepal Civil Service who are chosen through an open competitive exam of the Public Service Commission. The office is divided into four divisions each headed by a Deputy Auditor General. Under the divisions are 18 General Directorates which are further divided into 37 sector wise Directorates.

Divisions
 Governance System Division
 Finance and Economy Division
 Infrastructure Development Division
 Social Service Division

Annual Report
The Auditor General submits an annual report, which includes an opinion regarding the financial statements of the Government of Nepal, to the President as per Article 294 of the Constitution of Nepal. The President then presents the report for discussion to the Federal Parliament, through the Prime Minister.

References

Government of Nepal
Nepal
Supreme audit institutions
1958 establishments in Nepal